Antonio Costanzo Dimitri, also known as Antonio Di Mitri, Tony Di Mitri, Tony Dimitri and George Stevenson (Manduria, 12 June 1931 – Rome, 8 December 2019), was an Italian actor and singer.

Biography 

Antonio Costanzo Dimitri was born in Manduria, a small town in Apulia from which he moved as a boy. After living in Turin for some years he decided to move to Rome, to attend the prestigious Accademia Nazionale di Arte Drammatica Silvio D'Amico. He debuted at the Greek Theater of Syracus in "Hippolytus", directed by Orazio Costa. Shortly after he took part in several theatrical tours with Enrico Maria Salerno.

In 1953 Dimitri had his film debut in The Merchant of Venice by Pierre Billon and Senso by Luchino Visconti. Those were the years of the "Dolce Vita", where he had several relationships with well-known actresses such as Silvana Pampanini and Lea Massari.

In 1965 he started his singing career, releasing three singles under CGD : L'hanno ucciso a Roma, Hanno rapito il presidente  and Un velo bianco. In the same years he was also co-protagonist, alongside Amedeo Nazzari, of Hanno rapito il presidente by Dino Verde.

In '68 Dimitri was the protagonist, alongside Francesca Bertini, of the hit TV show La fiera dei Sogni, hosted by Mike Bongiorno. In '69 he joined the world-famous theatrical representation of Ariosto's Orlando Furioso directed by Luca Ronconi, where he played the part of King Suleiman the Magnificent.

In the early '70s he had profound spiritual awakening and decided to go back to his roots, studying and performing the traditional music of his region, the Salento. He released two folk albums I canti del prato verde (1972, as Antonio Di Mitri) and Taratatani (1974, as Antonio Dimitri).

In 1974 he played Yanez in the TV show The Tigers of Mompracen, alongside Gigi Proietti and directed by Ugo Gregoretti.

He died on 8 December 2019 at 88 years of age.

Partial filmography 

 The Merchant of Venice, by Pierre Billon (1953)
 La Traviata, by di Vittorio Cottafavi (1953)
 Senso, regia di Luchino Visconti (1954)
 Rome 1585, regia di Mario Bonnard (1961)
 A Girl... and a Million, regia di Luciano Salce (1962)
 I normanni, regia di Giuseppe Vari (1962)
 Shivers in Summer, regia di Luigi Zampa (1964)
 Two Mafiamen in the Far West, regia di Giorgio Simonelli (1964)
 Ali Baba and the Seven Saracens, regia di Emimmo Salvi (1964)
 The Good, the Bad and the Ugly by di Sergio Leone (1964)
 Red Roses for the Fuhrer, by di Fernando Di Leo (1968)
 May God Forgive You... But I Won't, regia di Vincenzo Musolino (1968)
 Quintana, regia di Vincenzo Musolino (1968)
 Dal nostro inviato a Copenaghen, regia di Alberto Cavallone (1970)
 Una colt in mano al diavolo, regia di Gianfranco Baldanello (1973)

Television 

 Il romanzo di un maestro, regia di Mario Landi (1959) – TV series
 Ritorna il tenente Sheridan – TV series, 1 episode (1963)
 Caravaggio, regia di Silverio Blasi (1967) – TV series
 Sheridan: Squadra omicidi, regia di Leonardo Cortese (1967) – TV series
 Joe Petrosino, regia di Daniele D'Anza (1972) – TV series
 The Tigers of Mompracen, regia di Ugo Gregoretti (1974) – TV series
 Orlando Furioso, regia di Luca Ronconi (1975) – TV series

Partial discography 

 1972 – I canti del prato verde – Antiche canzoni regionali popolari italiane (as Antonio Di Mitri)
 1974 – Taratatani – Antichi canti popolari della Puglia salentina (as Antonio Dimitri)
 1977 – Rutulì rutulà – Il mondo è una rotella, volta gira e se ne va (as Antonio Dimitri)

Singles 

 1965 – L'hanno ucciso a Roma/Carnevale di sangue (as Tony Di Mitri)
 1965 – Hanno rapito il presidente/Il telefono dell'incubo (as Tony Di Mitri)
 1965 – Un velo bianco/La farfalla innocente (as Tony Di Mitri)

Notes 

Italian folk singers
Italian pop singers
Italian male actors
1931 births
2019 deaths
People from Apulia